The American state of Colorado has many music scenes and venues, especially in the larger cities like Denver and Colorado Springs.

Colorado's orchestras include the Colorado Symphony Orchestra, Boulder Philharmonic Orchestra, and the Colorado Springs Philharmonic, among others.

Folk and traditional music in Colorado has been an integral part of the local popular culture in the last century. The Colorado Bluegrass Music Society exists to promote Coloradan bluegrass music, and publishes a magazine called Pow'r Pickin.

Colorado bands and artists

Local bands and musicians as well as those often associated with Colorado include:
 
The Red Iron Push (Country/Rock)
16 Horsepower (Alternative/Country/Rock)
3OH!3 (Pop)
50/50innertainment (Rap/Hip-Hop)
Air Dubai (Alternative Hip-Hop)
All (Punk)
Allegaeon (Extreme Metal)
Anti-Scrunti Faction (Punk)
The Apples in Stereo (Indie/Pop)
A Shoreline Dream (Rock)
The Astronauts (Surf)
Philip Bailey (R&B/Funk)
Ginger Baker (Jazz)
Big Gigantic (Instrumental Electronica)
Big Head Todd and the Monsters (Rock/Blues)
Bloodstrike (Metal)
Tommy Bolin (1960s-1970s)
Joe Bonner (Jazz)
Breathe Carolina (Electronic Rock)
Antonia Brico (Classical)
Mark Brooks
Calm (hip hop)
Cellador (Heavy Metal)
Cephalic Carnage (Extreme Metal)
Christie Front Drive (Post-hardcore, Indie, Emo)
Churchill (Acoustic/Bluegrass/Folk Rock)
The Czars (Rock/Alternative)
Demetrius Ross (Pop/Hip Hop/R&B)
 Jack Stein (Country/Rock)
Judy Collins (Folk)
John Denver (Folk/Country) 4 #1 Billboard Hot 100 songs (d. 1997)
DeVotchKa (Indie/Alternative)
Dressy Bessy (Indie)
 The Drood (Electronic Rock)
Drop Dead, Gorgeous (Rock)
Earth, Wind & Fire (R&B)
Elephant Revival (Folk)
Fear Before the March of Flames (Rock)
Firefall (Rock)
Five Iron Frenzy (Ska)
Flobots (Rap-Rock)
The Fluid (Rock)
Stelth Ulvang (Folk Rock)
Josephine Foster (Folk)
The Fray (Adult Contemporary/Soft Rock). #1 Billboard 200 album with The Fray in 2009. Isaac Slade graduated from the University of Colorado Denver.
Frogs Gone Fishin' (Funk)
The Gamits (Pop/Punk)
Miriam Gideon (composer) 
Dave Grusin (composer). 10-time Grammy award winner.
Tom Hamilton, Aerosmith bassist (rock)
Havok (Metal)
Hit and Run (Bluegrass)
Idlewhile (Indie/Americana)
Illenium  (Future Bass/Dubstep)
India.Arie (R&B/Soul). Had a #1 Billboard 200 album in 2006.
Javon Jackson (Jazz)
Jag Panzer (Heavy Metal)
Mike Johnson (guitarist)
Andy Kirk (Jazz) 
Leftover Salmon (Jam)
Willie Lewis (Rockabilly)
The Lumineers (Folk/Alternative). Had a #1 Billboard 200 album, folk rock Cleopatra in 2016.
Meese (Alternative)
Ron Miles (Jazz)
Glenn Miller (Jazz) his "In the Mood" became the best-selling swing instrumental (d. 1944)
The Minders (Indie)
Mr. J. Medeiros (Hip-Hop)
Michael Martin Murphey (Pop/Country Western)
The Motet (American funk, soul and jazz)
Neighborhood Bully (Pop/Rock)
The Northern Way (Pop/Rock)
Neutral Milk Hotel (Indie/Folk/Lo-Fi) Relocated to Denver to record On Avery Island and In the Aeroplane Over the Sea.
OneRepublic (Pop/Rock/Alternative/Folk) Two #2 Hot 100 hits, including "Apologize".
Opera Colorado (Opera)
Paper Bird (Americana/Folk)
Matt Pike
Playalitical (Rap/Hip-Hop)
Stryker & MFT (Rap/Hip-Hop)
The Photo Atlas (Pop/Rock)
Roy Porter (Jazz drummer) 
Pretty Lights (Electronic)
Primitive Man (Metal)
The Procussions (Hip-Hop)
Paul Quinichette (Jazz) 
Nathaniel Rateliff
Dean Reed (Rock 'n' Roll)
Dianne Reeves (Jazz)
Rivulets (Indie/Singer-Songwriter)
Roper (Pop/Punk)
Rose Hill Drive (Rock)
The Samples (Jam/Rock)
SHEL (Folk/Pop)
Single File (Pop)
Slim Cessna's Auto Club (Alternative/Country/Rock)
Jill Sobule (Folk)
The String Cheese Incident (Jam)
Sugarloaf (Rock)
Sweet Lillies (Bluegrass)
Dallas Taylor (drummer) 
Sally Taylor (singer-songwriter)
Tennis (Alternative)
Thinking Plague (Avant/Progressive)
Tickle Me Pink (Pop)
Time (indie hip hop)
TomFromHELL (Dubstep/ Electronic) 
Trip Face (Hip-Hop)
Vaux (Alternative, 1990s-2000s)
Laura Veirs (Folk) 
Velvet Acid Christ (Electronic/Industrial, 1990s-2000s)
The VSS (Post-hardcore/Experimental Rock) 
Mary Watkins (Folk and Jazz pianist) 
Paul Whiteman (Jazz bandleader, composer, violinist) 
Wendy Woo (Singer/Songwriter)
Wovenhand (Alternative/Country/Rock)
Vale of Pnath (Technical Death Metal)
Yonder Mountain String Band (Bluegrass)
Zephyr (Rock)

List of notable Colorado music venuesFort Collins'

Washington's, 132 Laporte Ave.
The Armory, 314 East Mountain Ave.
Aggie Theater

Boulder
Fox Theatre, 1135 13th St.
Macky Auditorium, CU-Boulder campus
Boulder Theater, 2032 14th St.
Chautauqua Auditorium

Broomfield
1stBank Center

Colorado Springs
World Arena, 3185 Venetucci Blvd.
Pikes Peak Center for the Performing Arts, 190 S. Cascade Ave.
The Black Sheep, 2106 E Platte Ave
Sunshine Studios Live, 3970 Clearview Frontage Rd.

Denver
Fillmore Auditorium, 1510 Clarkson St.
Ogden Theatre, 935 E. Colfax Ave.
Ball Arena, 1000 Chopper Pl.
Bluebird Theater, 3317 E. Colfax Ave.
Paramount Theater, 1621 Glenarm Pl.
Gothic Theater, 3263 S Broadway
Cervantes, 2637 Welton St.
Summit Music Hall, 1902 Blake St.
Mission Ballroom

Greenwood Village
Fiddler's Green Amphitheatre

Longmont
Dickens Opera House

Loveland
Budweiser Events Center

Morrison
Red Rocks Amphitheatre has the Colorado Music Hall of Fame (which features the John Denver "Spirit" statue)

See also
Arapaho music
Indigenous music of North America
Music of Denver
State of Colorado
Leftover Salmon: Thirty Years of Festival! (Book)

References

 
Colorado